Manic Compression is the second studio album by American post-hardcore band Quicksand. It was first released on February 24, 1995 on vinyl through Revelation Records, before being given a widespread CD release through Island Records on February 28, 1995. The album influenced many post-hardcore and alternative metal bands. It peaked at number 135 on the Billboard 200.

It was Quicksand's last studio album before their initial breakup, leading to a 22-year gap in output until the release of Interiors, in 2017. In the meantime, a follow-up album was conceptualized during their brief 1997–1999 reunion, but it never materialized.

A vinyl version of the album was released in early 2013 by Shop Radio Cast. It incorrectly lists "Landmine Spring" as the first song on the B-side on the cover, when the song is the last song pressed on the A-side.

Critical reception
The Encyclopedia of Popular Music called Manic Compression "another bracing collection of cerebral punk songs." Trouser Press wrote that "producers Wharton Tiers ... and Don Fury condense the sonics considerably on tracks like the writhing 'Divorce' and the brittle 'Thorn in My Side.'"

Track listing

Personnel 
 Quicksand
 Walter Schreifels – guitar, vocals
 Tom Capone – guitar
 Sergio Vega – bass
 Alan Cage – drums
 George Marino – mastering
 Don Fury – production, mixing
 Wharton Tiers – production
 Melinda Beck – illustration
 Joseph Cultice – photography
 Satoru Igarashi – design

References 

1995 albums
Quicksand (band) albums
Albums produced by Wharton Tiers
Albums produced by Don Fury